Silver Snag Lake is a lake on Vancouver Island just east of Tsable Lake and south west of the town of Cumberland.

See also
List of lakes of British Columbia

References

Alberni Valley
Lakes of Vancouver Island
Nelson Land District